(also known as Super Express 109) is a 1975 Japanese action thriller film directed by Junya Satō and starring Ken Takakura, Sonny Chiba, and Ken Utsui. When a Shinkansen ("bullet train") is threatened with a bomb that will explode automatically if it slows below 80 km/h unless a ransom is paid, police race to find the bombers and to learn how to defuse the bomb.

Plot
Tetsuo Okita is a former businessman who lost his manufacturing company to bankruptcy and separated from his wife and son a year earlier. Desperate to make ends meet and start over, he collaborates with activist Masaru Koga and his former employee Hiroshi Ōshiro in an elaborate plot to extort money from the government.

Hikari 109 is a high-speed 0 series bullet train carrying 1,500 passengers from Tokyo to Hakata. Shortly after the train's departure, railway security head Miyashita is notified by Okita that a bomb has been planted aboard and will explode if the train slows down below 80 km/h. As proof of the bomb's efficiency, Okita tells Miyashita that a similar bomb has been placed on freight train 5790 bound from Yūbari to Oiwake. When freight train 5790 indeed explodes, Hikari 109s conductor Aoki is informed by Shinkansen director Kuramochi not to slow down the train below 120 km/h while the security personnel aboard the train search for the bomb - thus delaying the trip to Hakata by three hours. Police officials back in Tokyo are tasked to either find the bomber or the bomb first.

Back aboard Hikari 109, passengers start becoming weary and demand for the train to stop when security does a second search. For the duration of the journey, Kuramochi must coordinate with Aoki on timing the train's speed and position to avoid incoming traffic while keeping it safe from the speed-sensitive detonator. Okita calls the National Railway authorities again; this time, he demands US$5 million in an aluminum suitcase in exchange for the safety of Hikari 109s passengers. As the Prime Minister prepares the ransom, police find their first lead when a cigarette pack containing fingerprints of Koga are found at Yūbari station prior to freight train 5790's departure.

Meanwhile, passengers aboard Hikari 109 start to panic when the train passes through Nagoya, with a pregnant passenger named Kazuko Hirao going into labor. As a means of settling down the passengers, co-engineer Kikuchi tells them of the bomb on board. National Railway officials are in further disdain when they realize that the bomb is attached to one of the train's wheels. Okita once more calls the officials and tells them to send the money northbound via helicopter and land at Yorii High School. Officer Senda, who carries the suitcase, is then instructed to cross the Arakawa River; upon reaching Iwate, the suitcase is roped and pulled up a cliff by Ōshiro. However, Ōshiro is forced to drop the case and retreat when police yell at a university judo team jogging nearby. Fleeing via motorcycle, Ōshiro finds himself tailed by several squad cars until he collides with one and is killed after hitting a light post.

The passengers once again panic when a businessman threatens to pull the emergency door latch open as the train passes through Shin-Ōsaka; they are further exacerbated when they hear of Ōshiro's death on the radio. Meanwhile, police locate Koga, but fail to arrest him, despite wounding him during the chase. Koga limps back into Okita's hideout to have his gunshot wound tended. Okita ponders on giving up his mission, as he has failed to prevent any bloodshed, but Koga convinces him to carry on. As police trace the bomb parts to Okita's former company in Shimura, Okita makes another phone call and tells Miyashita to drop the money at an abandoned truck by the Kanda motorway in 10 minutes. After the police do as instructed, Okita takes the suitcase and makes his getaway. Back aboard the train, Kazuko loses her baby in a miscarriage and is in need of a blood transfusion. Okita then calls Miyashita and tells him to pick up a diagram of the bomb at Sun Plaza cafe in Shinbashi. Unfortunately, the cafe is destroyed in a fire by the time police arrive. When the police surround Okita's hideout, Koga blows himself up with a stick of dynamite rather than turn himself in.

With no other options left, Kuramochi goes on television to make an appeal for Okita to help them disable the bomb. On the train, Shinji Fujio, a former accomplice of Okita being escorted after his arrest, reveals that Okita is on his way out of Japan using a false name. With the help of high-speed cameras, the Shinkansen authorities manage to locate the bomb underneath the second coach. Kuramochi relays the information to Aoki and sends a rescue train to provide welding equipment to cut an access hole where the bomb is. Aoki succeeds in defusing the bomb, but the authorities suspect a second bomb located elsewhere underneath the train. Despite this, the government gives the order to stop the train. Aoki manages to stop Hikari 109 without incident. As Kuramochi leaves the main control room to regain his composure, he discovers that his appeal is still being broadcast on TV. Miyashita explains that this is part of the police's trap for Okita. Overwhelmed by the pressure of the day's situation, Kuramochi resigns from his position.

Meanwhile, at Haneda Airport, Okita prepares to board his flight, but his cover is blown when his ex-wife Yasuko Tomita and son Kenichi spot him. He is shot dead while attempting to escape outside the airport.

Cast

 Ken Takakura as Tetsuo Okita
 Shinichi Chiba as Aoki
 Ken Utsui as Kuramochi
 Fumio Watanabe as Miyashita
 Kei Yamamoto as Masaru Koga
 Eiji Gō as Shinji Fujio
 Akira Oda as Hiroshi Ōshiro
 Yasuhiro Aoki as Officer Senda
 Raita Ryū as Kikuchi
 Masayo Utsunomiya as Yasuko Tomita
 Yumiko Fujita as Akiyama
 Miyako Tasaka as Kazuko Hirao
 Etsuko Shihomi as telephone operator
 Tetsurō Tamba as Sunaga
 Takashi Shimura as JNR President
 Akira Yamauchi as Cabinet Chief Secretary
 Tomoo Nagai as JNR Bullet Train General Director 
 Kunie Tanaka as Koga's brother
 Kin'ya Kitaōji as Detective at airport
 Tamio Kawachi as Satô
 Mizuho Suzuki as Hanamura
 Yumi Takigawa as SAS Staff
 Jirō Chiba as Rescue Train Driver
 Rikinaga Nakano as Osaka Businessman
 Saburo Date as Businessman
 Susumu Kurobe as Goto
 Yoshifumi Tajima as Saki

Release
The Bullet Train premiered in Japan on 5 July 1975. It was released in North America on 1 January 1976. The film was retitled Super Express 109 for its release in France on 30 June 1976.

Home media

The U.S. version of The Bullet Train was bundled with Golgo 13: Assignment Kowloon and Executioner in the Kill Chiba Collection Region 1 DVD set by Crash Cinema on 18 May 2004. On 20 November 2007, BCI Eclipse released both the original Japanese and English versions of the film in their Sonny Chiba Collection DVD set, which also includes Golgo 13: Assignment Kowloon, Dragon Princess, The Bodyguard, Karate Warriors, and Sister Street Fighter. The original Japanese version was released on Blu-ray by Twilight Time on 13 December 2016, with a limited run of 3,000 units.

In the UK, the English dub of the film was bundled with Golgo 13: Assignment Kowloon and G.I. Samurai in The Sonny Chiba Collection Vol. 2 Region 2 DVD set by Optimum Home Releasing.

Toei Video released the film on DVD on 21 June 2002. On 9 December 2005, Toei released a special two-disc  DVD featuring the French and English versions. The film was released on Blu-ray on 25 October 2017.

Legacy

Novelization
A novelization of the film was written by Joseph Rance and Arei Kato, and released in 1980.

Similar films
The Burning Train is a 1980 Indian film with a similar premise.

The 1994 American action film Speed was inspired by both Runaway Train and The Bullet Train. Screenwriter Graham Yost was told by his father, Canadian television host Elwy Yost, about a 1985 film called Runaway Train starring Jon Voight, about a train that speeds out of control. Elwy mistakenly believed that the train's situation was due to a bomb on board. Such a theme had in fact been used in The Bullet Train. After seeing the Voight film, Graham decided that it would have been better if there had been a bomb on board a bus with the bus being forced to travel at 20 mph to prevent an actual explosion. A friend suggested that this be increased to 50 mph.

Tezz is a 2012 Indian film with many elements from this film.

References

External links
 

Shinkansen Daibakuha at the Japanese Movie Database  

1975 films
1975 action films
1975 crime drama films
1970s disaster films
Japanese action thriller films
Japanese crime drama films
1970s Japanese films
Toei Company films
1970s Japanese-language films
Japanese disaster films
Films about terrorism in Asia
Films directed by Junya Satō
Films set in Fukuoka Prefecture
Films set in Hokkaido
Films set in Saitama Prefecture
Films set in Tokyo
Films set in airports
Films set on trains
Films shot in Tokyo